The Agnes Etherington Art Centre is located in Kingston, Ontario, in the heart of the historic campus of Queen's University. Situated on traditional Anishinaabe and Haudenosaunee Territory, the gallery has received a number of awards for its exhibitions from the Canada Council for the Arts, the Ontario Association of Art Galleries and others.

History
The Agnes has its roots in the Kingston Art and Music Club, founded in 1926, and owes its existence to Agnes McCausland Richardson Etherington (1880–1954), a driving force behind the club. Agnes Etherington's grandfather had founded the grain dealer James Richardson & Sons in 1857 and the family had become very wealthy. Agnes's brother George Richardson, who died fighting in World War I in 1916, left a legacy for her to use as she felt fit to stimulate development of the arts at Queen's University. She used this to found the George Taylor Richardson Memorial Fund, which still provides an important source of arts funding to the university.

Agnes Etherington bequeathed her house, an elegant Neo-Georgian mansion, to Queen's University for use as a university and community art gallery. The Agnes Etherington Art Centre opened to the public in 1957. The building was extended in 1962, 1975, 1978 and 2000, and now has an area of 1,720 square metres.

Facilities
In addition to the historical Etherington House and nine galleries, the Agnes Etherington Art Centre features a studio, atrium, a publications lounge and the David McTavish Art Study Room.

Events and public programs

Through the fall and winter, lectures, discussions, tours, custom seminars and screenings. Each summer, the gallery offers an art-intensive summer day camp for children and an art course of teens.

Collections
Agnes Etherington Art Centre holds over 17,000 works ranging from the 14th century to the present, placing it among the largest galleries in Ontario. It includes paintings, sculptures, and graphics by major Canadian artists, European old master paintings, African art, historical dress, quilts, silver and decorative art.

Canadian Historical Art
The Canadian Historical collection primarily representing the history of Canadian fine art in the Euro-American tradition, it also reflects the evolving Canadian cultural matrix through Inuit and Indigenous art and artifacts, as well as historic dress and decorative arts. The collection is notable for fine early topographical watercolours and major 20th-century paintings, and encompasses material connected to regional history in the Queen's University Collection of Canadian Dress, the Heritage Quilt Collection, and the Silver Collection. The Canadian historical collection includes works by: Andre Charles Bieler, Tom Thomson, Emily Carr, Lawren Harris, Arthur Lismer, Frederick Varley, Edwin Holgate, LeMoine FitzGerald,  Fernand Leduc, Ozias Leduc, David Milne, William Ronald, Carl Beam, William Henry Bartlett, William Brymner, Kananginak Pootoogook, Pitseolak Ashoona

Contemporary Art
The Contemporary Art Collection features visual art, with emphasis on the emerging generation of artists and works that reflect contemporary life and Canadian society. It is national in scope. The Contemporary collection includes works by: Charles Stankievech, Rebecca Belmore, Judy Radul, Brendan Fernandes, Luis Jacob, Vera Frenkel, David Rokeby, Norman White, Robert Houle, Shary Boyle, AA Bronson, General Idea, Ian Carr-Harris, Sarindar Dhaliwal, Andre Fauteux, Kim Ondaatje, Derek Sullivan

Historical European Art
The European Art Collection holds many paintings, prints, and drawings of exceptional quality and depth. The heart of the European collection is The Bader Collection, with over 200 paintings donated by philanthropist Alfred Bader and Isabel Bader. The European collection includes works by Rembrandt van Rijn, Willem Drost, Jan Lievens, Govert Flinck, Aert de Gelder, Gerbrand van den Eeckhout, Godfrey Kneller, Philip de Koninck, Ferdinand Bol, El Greco, Dosso Dossi, Michael Sweerts, Luca Giordano, Georg Pencz, Sebastien Bourdon, Peter Lely, Joseph Wright of Derby, Raphael, Parmigianino, Guido Reni, Gustav Klimt, Pablo Picasso

African Art
Numbering over 500 objects, the Justin and Elisabeth Lang Collection of African Art ranks among Canada's most comprehensive and significant African Art collections. Comprising primarily works by West and Central African peoples.

Selected Works from the Collection

Selected publications

The Art Centre has issued many publications over the years. A selection follows:

References

External links
Agnes Etherington Art Centre  - official site

Art museums and galleries in Ontario
Museums in Kingston, Ontario
University museums in Canada
Queen's University at Kingston
Arts centres in Canada
1957 establishments in Ontario
Art museums established in 1957
James Richardson & Sons